Null ideal may refer to:
The ideal of null sets in measure theory
An ideal that is a pseudo-ring of square zero in ring theory